"Rhythm Bomb" is a promotional single released by the British electronic band the Prodigy. It was released on 25 March 2015 for their album The Day Is My Enemy. The song uses a sample from the 1990 song "Make My Body Rock 1990" by Jomanda.

Track listing

Official versions
"Rhythm Bomb" (Edit) (3:15)

References

The Prodigy songs
2015 singles
2015 songs
Songs written by Liam Howlett
Songs written by Flux Pavilion
Song recordings produced by Flux Pavilion
Cooking Vinyl singles